Major-General Sir Charles Patrick Amyatt Hull,  (3 July 1865 – 24 July 1920) was a senior British Army officer who served during the Second Boer War and World War I. He was the father of Field Marshal Sir Richard Hull and the grandfather of Lieutenant General Richard Swinburn.

Military career
Educated at Trinity College, Cambridge, Hull was commissioned as a second lieutenant into the Royal Scots Fusiliers on 16 November 1887. He was promoted to lieutenant on 10 September 1890, and to captain on 24 February 1897. Appointed adjutant of the 2nd battalion on 23 January 1899, he was among the officers in charge as the battalion was sent to South Africa in late October 1899, following the outbreak of the Second Boer War. He was wounded at the battle of the Tugela Heights in late February 1900, as his battalion took part in the Relief of Ladysmith.

He became Commanding Officer (CO) of the 4th Battalion, Middlesex Regiment in August 1914 and led his battalion at the Battle of Mons later that month and at the Great Retreat in September 1914 during the First World War. He went on to be commander of the 10th Brigade in November 1914, General Officer Commanding (GOC) 56th (1/1st London) Division in February 1916 and, after a period of recovery following major surgery in the United Kingdom in the autumn and winter of 1917, he became GOC 16th (Irish) Division in February 1918. He returned to the 56th Division in May 1918 and then transferred to become GOC 43rd (Wessex) Infantry Division in June 1919 before retiring in September 1920.

References

|-

|-

|-

1865 births
1920 deaths
British Army major generals
British Army generals of World War I
Royal Scots Fusiliers officers
British Army personnel of the Second Boer War
Middlesex Regiment officers
Knights Commander of the Order of the Bath
Graduates of the Staff College, Camberley
Alumni of Trinity College, Cambridge
People from Kensington
Military personnel from London